This is an incomplete list of earthquakes in Albania.

See also
 Geology of Albania
 List of earthquakes in Greece
 List of earthquakes in Croatia
 List of earthquakes in Italy
 List of earthquakes in 2019

References

Albania
 
Earthquakes